"Snow" is a song by Australian singer-songwriters Angus & Julia Stone, released on 13 June 2017 as the lead single from their fourth studio album Snow (2017).

Track listing

Charts

Certifications

References

2017 songs
2017 singles
Angus & Julia Stone songs
Songs written by Julia Stone